Gigantidas gladius is a species of large, deepwater, hydrothermal vent mussel, a marine bivalve mollusc in the family Mytilidae, or mussels.

Distribution and habitat
These mussels are found around deep-sea hydrothermal vents on the southern Kermadec Ridge, New Zealand. They form dense beds in these sites.

Description
The shells of this species are up to 30 cm long.

References

 SeaLifeBase
 Photo
 TePapa 

gladius
Molluscs described in 2003